Svenska Cupen 1953 was the twelfth season of the main Swedish football Cup. The competition was concluded on 26 July 1953 with the Final, held at Råsunda Stadium, Solna in Stockholms län. Malmö FF won 3-2 against IFK Norrköping before an attendance of 20,356 spectators.

First round
For all results see SFS-Bolletinen - Matcher i Svenska Cupen.

Second round
For all results see SFS-Bolletinen - Matcher i Svenska Cupen.

Quarter-finals
The 4 matches in this round were played on 19 July 1953.

Semi-finals
The semi-finals in this round were played on 22 and 23 July 1953.

Final
The final was played on 26 July 1953 at the Råsunda Stadium.

Footnotes

References 

1953
Cup
Sweden